There are at least 40 named mountains in Carter County, Montana.
 Belcher Mountain, el. 
 Belltower Butte, el. 
 Big Hill, el. 
 Black Point, el. 
 Blue Mud Hills, el. 
 Capitol Rock, el. 
 Chimney Rock, el. 
 Coal Creek Hill, el. 
 Coal Creek Hill, el. 
 Dead Horse Point, el. 
 Dutchmans Hill, el. 
 Finger Buttes, el. 
 Flasted Hill, el. 
 Grassy Butte, el. 
 Greasy Hill, el. 
 Hackett Butte, el. 
 Haystack Butte, el. 
 Indian Butte, el. 
 Mud Butte, el. 
 Newberry Knob, el. 
 Pine Hill, el. 
 Piney Butte, el. 
 Pocochichee Butte, el. 
 Potato Buttes, el. 
 Potato Buttes, el. 
 Red Hill, el. 
 Roosevelt Rock, el. 
 Saddle Butte, el. 
 Saddle Butte, el. 
 Sheep Mountain, el. 
 Stone Lady Rock, el. 
 Stormy Butte, el. 
 Three Peaks, el. 
 Timber Hill, el. 
 Tip Top Butte, el. 
 Twin Buttes, el. 
 W L Butte, el. 
 West Butte, el. 
 Wilder Butte, el. 
 Wolf Point, el.

See also
 List of mountains in Montana
 List of mountain ranges in Montana

Notes

Landforms of Carter County, Montana
Carter